Aristóteles Sandoval assumed office as Governor of the State of Jalisco on 1 March 2013, and his term ended on 5 December 2018. The governor has the authority to nominate members of his Cabinet of the State of Jalisco, as per the Ley Orgánica del Poder Ejecutivo del Estado de Jalisco, Article 4, Section V.

Cabinet

Notes

References 

State governments of Mexico
Cabinets established in 2013
Cabinets disestablished in 2018